The Low Carbon Innovation Centre (LCIC) is the commercial hub for all of the University of East Anglia’s (UEA) carbon-related activities. The centre opened in October 2008 joining together two existing brands, the Carbon Reduction Programme (CRed) and Carbon Connections  and expanding the consultancy wing. The centre is linked to School of Environmental Sciences at UEA and its Chief Executive Officer of LCIC is Dr. Chris Harrison.

The Low Carbon Innovation Centre (LCIC) was established by the University of East Anglia (UEA) in October 2008 to house the university's externally facing low carbon activities. LCIC is the strategic and administrative hub for all UEA's low carbon and climate change innovation activities. Drawing on the research expertise of the 5** rated Environmental Sciences school, LCIC seeks to accelerate the uptake of carbon-reducing technologies and practices and stimulate economic growth.

They provide the following services:

 Carbon Consulting
 Carbon Reduction Systems
 Innovation Management
 Management Development

LCIC is responsible for co-ordinating the construction of the Combined Heat and Power biomass gasifier plant at UEA. This plant is due to open in 2010 and will reduce the university's carbon emissions by over 30% on 1990 levels. It will operate at 84% efficiency, thought to be the UK's most efficient power plant.

References

External links
 

University of East Anglia